Officer Friendly is a model program to acquaint children and young adults with law enforcement officials as a part of a community relations campaign. The program was especially popular in the United States from the 1960s to the 1980s, but it continues in some police departments. Officer Friendly is generally not a specific character, and is in the public domain.

In 1974, Sears-Roebuck Foundation partnered with John H. Coleman, Jr with the Hampton, Virginia police department and Hampton City school to revise the program. 

Classroom kits were developed including coloring books, videos, board game and teaching guides with activities. The classroom kits were distributed to 40 school districts throughout the United States. An original copy of the kit can be found at the Hampton, Virginia City Museum.

Methods
The Officer Friendly programs most famously involved police officers visiting pre-school and kindergarten classrooms. In many parts of the United States, Officer Friendly coloring books are distributed to children.

In popular culture
There have been many parodies of the nearly ubiquitous program. In many cases, the term "Officer Friendly" is used sarcastically to refer to an abusive police officer.

In television
 SCTV performed a parody skit called "Officer Friendly" on November 28, 1977.
 Rick Grimes, a former sheriff's deputy in The Walking Dead, sarcastically introduced himself to Merle Dixon as Officer Friendly, while handcuffing him (in Season 1, episode 2 "Guts"), and Merle thereafter referred to him that way, derisively (e.g., in Season 3, episode 15, "This Sorrowful Life").

In literature 
 In The Annihilation Score, sixth novel of The Laundry Files, the general public begins to develop super powers through a surge in magical energy. A police officer named Jim Grey develops such powers and begins operating as a superhero under the alias "Officer Friendly".

See also
Community policing
Police
Copaganda
Good cop/bad cop

References

Law enforcement in the United States